Nagore Folgado García (born 23 March 2004) is a Spanish Paralympic athlete who competes in sprinting events at international elite track and field competitions. She is a European champion in the 100 metres and silver medalist in the 200 metres, she has also competed at the 2020 Summer Paralympics.

Folgado had bilateral retinoblastoma at two years old, her left eye is totally blind and she has very limited vision in her right eye.

References

2004 births
Living people
Sportspeople from Valencia
Paralympic athletes of Spain
Spanish female sprinters
Athletes (track and field) at the 2020 Summer Paralympics
Medalists at the World Para Athletics European Championships